{{Infobox College
| name = The Higher and Technical Institute Mizoram
| image_name =
| motto = "Seek Share Serve"
| established = 2007
| type = College
| religious_affiliation = Baptist Church of Mizoram
| city = Lunglei
| state = Mizoram
| country = India
| campus = Urban 

}}
The Higher and Technical Institute Mizoram (HATIM''') is the first Christian residential co-educational college in Mizoram, India, and is located in Lunglei. HATIM was started in June 2007 as the first Christian College in Mizoram. HATIM is sponsored and promoted by the Baptist Church of Mizoram. All courses under HATIM are affiliated to Mizoram University.

History

The school was founded in 2007 by the Baptist Church of Mizoram.

Academic courses
HATIM offers the following courses. HATIM has the highest pass percentage among undergraduate colleges under Mizoram University.
Bachelor of Computer Application (BCA)
Bachelor of Commerce (B.Com) with specialisation in E-Commerce and Finance.
Bachelor of Social Work (BSW)
Bachelor of Arts (BA) in English, Philosophy, History, Psychology, Education.

References

External links
 

Universities and colleges in Mizoram
Colleges affiliated to Mizoram University
Lunglei
Christian universities and colleges in India